Azhagana Naatkal is a 2001 Indian Tamil-language comedy film directed by Sundar C. The film stars Karthik and Rambha and became the third collaboration of the pair with Sundar.C, after the successes of Ullathai Allitha (1996) and  Unakkaga Ellam Unakkaga (1999). The film also featured Mumtaj, Goundamani and Senthil in pivotal roles and featured music composed by Deva. The film was released on 7 December 2001 and is a remake of the Malayalam film Minnaram (1994)  and is also loosely based on Jaishankar film Penne Nee Vaazhga.

Plot 
Indu and Chandru fall in love. Indu does the disappearing act and Chandru gets engaged to Rekha. Indu re-appears after three years with a little girl, who she claims is Chandru's daughter. Chandru vehemently denies it and finding Indu's presence an embarrassment tries to ferret out the truth. After many scenes of forced comedy, it is revealed that the girl is the illegitimate daughter of Chandru's much-married brother, who had seduced Indu's sister. After his brother's futile attempt to play the villain, Chandru latches on to Indu fast enough with no apology to Rekha. But it is not really Chandru's fault. For Rekha had done the disappearing act from the scene early enough without any explanation either.

Cast 

Karthik as Chandru
Rambha as Indu
Mumtaj as Rekha
Goundamani as Ranjith
Manivannan as Rajasekhar
Senthil as Mahali
Rajeev as Guna
Delhi Ganesh as Somasundaram
Ponnambalam as Somasundaram's nephew
Thalapathy Dinesh as Fighter
Madhan Bob as Doctor
Sabitha Anand as Guna's wife
Jyothi Meena as Asha
Chitra Lakshmanan
Anu Mohan
Vengal Rao
 Muthukaalai
Pandiarajan as Michael (Guest appearance)

Production 
Simran Bagga had originally signed on to play the lead role in the film, before she was replaced by Rambha. This is a Tamil remake of 1994 Malayalam film Minnaram.

Soundtrack 

The music was composed by Deva.

References

External links 
Azhagana Naatkal at Jointscene

2001 films
Films directed by Sundar C.
2000s Tamil-language films
Films shot in Ooty
Films scored by Deva (composer)
Tamil remakes of Malayalam films